The 2022–23 Tweede Divisie, known as Jack's League for sponsorship reasons, season is the seventh edition of the Dutch third tier since ending its hiatus since the 1970-71 season and the 22nd edition using the Tweede Divisie name.

The agreement that called for neither promotion to nor relegation from the Eerste Divisie, implemented in 2017 and recently extended in 2019, will end after this season.

Teams

Number of teams by province

Standings

Regular competition

Fixtures/results

References 

Tweede Divisie seasons
Tweede Divisie
Netherlands